The Peugeot 408 is a compact car (C-segment) produced by Peugeot. It was unveiled on January 25, 2010, at the Beijing Auto Show and sales began in China on April 8, 2010.  In November 2010, production of the 408 commenced in El Palomar, Buenos Aires, Argentina, with sales starting in April 2011.

Despite its name, it is not a direct successor to the Peugeot 407, but rather a long-wheelbase saloon version of the Peugeot 308 hatchback, primarily targeted at emerging markets such as China. The 408 is not slated for the Western European market, and not built there.



First generation (T7; 2010)

The 408 was available in China with either a 1.6 L and 2.0 L petrol four cylinder engine.

Either engine can be specified with a five speed manual or four speed automatic transmission.

In South America a 1.6 L diesel engine, known as a HDi (Allure, Feline/Griffe), is sold alongside the 2.0 L petrol engine (Allure, Feline/Griffe) and 1.6L THP petrol engine (Sport) with six speed automatic transmission.

In Malaysia, 408 comes with two engines, 1.6L Prince turbo engine and 2.0L petrol four cylinder engine.

The first generation 408 continued in production in Latin America and Russia, with multiple facelifts and minor changes. Production in Argentina was halted in 2021.

Second generation (T9; 2014)

The second generation Peugeot 408 was unveiled in the 2014 Beijing Auto Show. In June 2016, the international version of the Peugeot 408 (known as Peugeot 408 e-THP) was launched in Malaysia, though with only one engine choice and transmission. The second generation 408 launched in China is powered by a range of engine options including a 1.8-litre engine producing 139 hp, a 1.2-litre turbo engine with 136 hp, and 1.6-litre turbo engine with 167 hp. All engines are mated with a 6-speed automatic transmission, with a 6-speed manual transmission option also available for the 1.8-litre and 1.2-litre engines.

2018 facelift
A facelift was launched in 2018, featuring a redesigned front fascia, rear bumper, and tail lamps. Powertrain is carried over from the pre-facelift model.

2022 facelift
A second facelift for the 408 was revealed for the Chinese market in 8 June 2022. The front end is redesigned to reflect the same design language as the third-generation Peugeot 308. The bootlid is redesigned, featuring new graphics and taillights similar to the third-generation 308.

All trim levels are equipped with a model 5G06 1.6L turbo engine producing 125kW at 5500 rpm and 250Nm at 1750-4500 rpm, and an Aisin 3rd generation 6AT transmission.

Dongfeng Fukang ES600
The Dongfeng Fukang ES600 is an electric sedan based on the 2014–2018 pre-facelift Peugeot 408, launched under Dongfeng Peugeot-Citroën's Fukang brand.

References

External links

Peugeot 408 

408
Compact cars
Sedans
Cars of Argentina
Front-wheel-drive vehicles
Cars introduced in 2010
2010s cars
2020s cars